Between 1915 and 1917, EMY Ready assembled at his saddlery and cycle business in Wilmot Street, Burnie, Tasmania, under the "Acme" brand name. At least one of these bikes was powered by a Dalm two-stroke engine.

References

See also
List of motorcycle manufacturers

Motorcycle manufacturers of Australia
Motorcycles of Australia
Motorcycles introduced in the 1910s